Casella may refer to:

People 
 Casella (Divine Comedy) (died 1299), Italian composer and singer, none of whose works have survived
 Alessandra Casella (active 1983–2019), Italian economist, researcher, professor and author
 Alfredo Casella (1883–1947), Italian composer, pianist and conductor
 Arnaldo Casella Tamburini (1885–1936), Italian artist
 Carlos Casella (active 1988–2015), Argentinian actor, dancer, choreographer and singer
 Cesare Casella (born 1960), Italian chef, restaurateur, writer, consultant and educator
 Felicita Casella (c. 1820 – after 1865), Italian singer and composer of French birth
 George Casella (1951–2012), American statistician
 Giovanni Andrea Casella (active 1658), Swiss-Italian painter active in the Baroque period
 Giucas Casella (born 1949), Italian illusionist, hypnotist and television personality
 Jimmy Casella (1924–1976), poker player
 Karen Casella (active 1983–2017), American software engineer and advocate for inclusion in the technology industry
 Max Casella (born 1967), American actor
 Michel Casella (1940–), Argentinian Judoka
 The Casella Sisters, Ella (1858–1946) and Nelia (1859–1950), British artists

Places 
 Casella, Liguria, municipality in Province of Genoa, Italy
 Casella (Asolo), hamlet in municipality of Asolo, Italy

Companies 
 Casella Family Brands, Australian maker of Yellow Tail wine
 Casella Waste Systems, US waste management company

Other 
 Casella (genus), synonym of Glossodoris, genus of sea slugs
Casella obsoleta, now known as Goniobranchus obsoletus, species of colourful sea slug

See also
 Gilbert F. Casellas
 Caselle (disambiguation)
 Cassella (disambiguation), similar spelling